Euroa railway station is located on the North East line in Victoria, Australia. It serves the town of Euroa, and opened on 20 March 1873.

History
Euroa station was opened with the line, and the first permanent station building was erected in 1878. A second -long platform once existed at Euroa, against the goods shed wall, which was in use between 1880 and 1904, and permitted the handling of two crossing passenger trains. An iron footbridge linked the two platforms between 1900 and 1904.

The first lever frame for signals was provided in 1885, and was made part of the station building in 1929. The track layout was altered in 1931, remaining in that state until the 1970s, when it was rationalised to the layout seen today. Two pedestrian subways, as well as the overpass at Anderson Street to the south, were provided as part of the construction of the standard gauge line in 1960.

As part of the North East Rail Revitalisation Project, a second platform was constructed on the existing standard gauge line, in conjunction with the standard gauge conversion of the broad gauge track. Work began in December 2008, and was completed in late 2009.

Now-closed stations at Creighton, Longwood, Locksley and Monea were located between Euroa and Avenel, while Balmattum was located between Euroa and Violet Town.

Platforms and services
Euroa has two side platforms. It is served by V/Line Albury line trains.

Platform 1:
 services to Southern Cross

Platform 2:
 services to Albury

Transport links

Benalla Bus Lines operates one route to and from Euroa station, under contract to Public Transport Victoria:
to Shepparton

V/Line operates one road coach service via Euroa station:
Seymour station – Albury station

Gallery

References

External links
Victorian Railway Stations gallery

Railway stations in Australia opened in 1873
Regional railway stations in Victoria (Australia)
Euroa